This Island may refer to:

This Island (Le Tigre album), 2004, and its title track
This Island (Eurogliders album), 1984